Waghya (meaning tiger in Marathi) was a mixed-breed pet dog of Maratha king Chhatrapati Shivaji Maharaj, known as the epitome of loyalty and eternal devotion. After Shivaji Maharaj's death, he is said to have jumped into his master's funeral pyre and immolated himself.

A statue was put up on a pedestal next to Shivaji Maharaj's samadhi at Raigad Fort.  In 2011 the statue of Waghya was removed by alleged members of the Sambhaji Brigade as a protest but was later reinstalled.

Monument 
In memory of Waghya, a memorial was built next to Shivaji Maharaj's samadhi at Raigad Fort with a donation by Indore’s Prince Tukoji Holkar in 1906, who gave  towards the dog's statue.

Reportedly by Mid-Day, the statue of Waghya was erected on a Samadhi at Shivaji's memorial in 1936 under the banner of Shri Shivaji Raigad Smarak Samati (SSRSS) in leadership of Narasimha Chintaman Kelkar.

Attack on Waghya's Statue on Raigarh Fort 
In 2011, Sambhaji Brigade, an extremist group was responsible for a protest and attack against Waghya's statue located on Raigad Fort next to Shivaji Maharaj's memorial. The group claimed that the dog was not real and there shouldn't be a memorial for it. This act was strongly opposed by local Dhangar community for they believe that the dog was real.

In popular culture 
Waghya's heroic story was portrayed in Rajsanyas, a play by Ram Ganesh Gadkari, a noted Marathi playwright.

Gallery

Further reading

See also 
 List of individual dogs
 Raigad fort

References

Indian folklore
Maratha Empire
History of Maharashtra
Individual dogs
Shivaji